Bindi may refer to: 

 Bindi (decoration), a forehead decoration
 Bindi (name)

See also
 Bindii (disambiguation), a common name for several plant species
 Bhindi, or okra
 Bindy